Ace Of Space 1 is the first season of Indian reality competition television series, MTV Ace of Space. Hosted by Vikas Gupta, it aired from 20 October 2018 to 31 December 2018 on MTV India. After 71 days, Divya Agarwal emerged as the winner of the season.

Concept
Eighteen contestants fought it out in six rooms to win space in the house and in the hearts of the audience by performing difficult tasks and showcasing their personalities. After 71 days, the contestant with the highest votes combined with the space attained walked away with the title of Ace of Space.

Contestants

 Male
 Female

Living Status

Notes
 Evicted
 Left

Trump Card

Notes
 Trump Card Winner

Voting History

Notes
 Immune
 Pre-Nominated
 Fewest Votes
 Against Public Vote
 Evicted
 Left

Guests

References

External links

 Official Website

2018 Indian television seasons
MTV (Indian TV channel) original programming